Born Free is a book by Joy Adamson. Released in 1960 by Pantheon Books, it  describes Adamson's experiences raising a lion cub named Elsa. It was translated into several languages, and made into an Academy Award-winning 1966 film of the same name.

The book was rereleased in 2017 by Pan Books as part of their Pan 70th anniversary collection, celebrating their best-loved, best-selling stories.

References

1960 non-fiction books
Pantheon Books books
Books about lions
Autobiographies
Autobiographies adapted into films